Gillian Lindsay (born 24 September 1973, in Paisley) is a former Team GB Scottish rower. She won silver in the quadruple sculls at the 2000 Summer Olympics silver medalist, and two-time medal winner in the World Championships, taking silver in the double sculls in 1997 and gold in 1998. Since her retirement in 2001, she has focused on coaching and commentating.

Career

Rowing 
Encouraged by her former PE teacher, Gillian began rowing at age 13 while a pupil at St Andrew's Academy, Paisley. She trained at Clydesdale Amateur Rowing Club before being selected to join the senior GB international team at age 18 where she was coached by Mike Spracklen. She had her first taste of the Olympic Games in Barcelona in 1992, as part of in the women's coxless fours, coming in eighth. In 1997, she and partner Miriam Batten took silver in the double sculls at the 1997 World Rowing Championships at Aiguebelette-le-Lac. The following year, they won gold at the 1998 World Rowing Championships at Cologne. She won silver at the 2000 Olympic Games in Sydney, in the woman's quadruple sculls alongside crewmates Guin Batten, Katherine Grainger and Miriam Batten. At the time of her retirement from competition she was Britain's most successful woman sculler of all time.

Coaching 
She was Head of Rowing at The Lady Eleanor Holles School until moving on to teach Sports science at The Mount School, York in 2014. She is currently Head of Rowing at Wimbledon High School.

Commentating 
She is a regular expert commentator on rowing events for Eurosport sports network.

Awards 
In 2021, Gillian won the Scottish Women in Sport Pioneer Award, given in recognition of 'a woman/women or team who through their work in sport, which would largely have gone unrecognised, whether on or off the field, has empowered and inspired women and girls to participate in sport today'. She was presented with her award by her former crewmate, Katherine Grainger, who was guest of honour at the event.

References

External links
 
 

1973 births
Living people
Scottish female rowers
Sportspeople from Paisley, Renfrewshire
Rowers at the 1992 Summer Olympics
Rowers at the 2000 Summer Olympics
Olympic silver medallists for Great Britain
Olympic rowers of Great Britain
Olympic medalists in rowing
Scottish Olympic medallists
World Rowing Championships medalists for Great Britain
Medalists at the 2000 Summer Olympics
British female rowers